Alzen is a commune in the Ariège department in southwestern France.

Population

Inhabitants of Alzen are called Alzenois.

See also
Communes of the Ariège department

References

External links

 Official site

Communes of Ariège (department)